Anaeramoeba is a genus of anaerobic protists on uncertain phylogenetic position, first described in 2016.

Description 

As the name implies, Anaeramoeba are anaerobic amoeboid organisms which form a fan-like shape similar to that of Flamella. At least two species can also sometimes assume flagellate forms; with either two or four flagella. They contain double-membrane bound organelles assumed to be derived from mitochondria, usually associated with colonies of unidentified, rod-shaped bacteria.

Discovery and classification 

Anaeramoeba specimens were first isolated in 2016, from samples shallow water anoxic ocean sediments collected from around the world. Despite the similarities to Flamella in both morphology and environment, genetic analyses found that Anaeramoeba do not belong within Amoebozoa. The precise phylogenetic position was not identified with strong support, and the genus may represent a newly identified, deep-branching group of protists. Recent classifications have listed them as sister to Parabasalia in Metamonada.

References 

Eukaryote genera
Anaerobes
Phylogenetics
Amoeboids